The Early Years is a compilation album by English rock band Whitesnake, released in 2004. The album's track listing was compiled by David Coverdale, spanning 1978's Trouble to 1984's Slide It In.

Track listing
 "Walking in the Shadow of the Blues" - 4:19 
 "Sweet Talker" - 3:35 
 "Would I Lie to You" - 4:27 
 "Trouble" - 4:41 
 "Gambler" - 3:59 
 "Lovehunter" - 5:31 
 "Don't Break My Heart Again" - 4:00 
 "Ready an' Willing" - 3:15 
 "Child of Babylon" - 4:22 
 "Here I Go Again" - 4:58 
 "Carry Your Load" - 4:00 
 "Rough an' Ready" - 2:54 
 "Wine, Women an' Song" - 3:23 
 "Lie Down... I Think I Love You" - 3:09 
 "Ain't No Love in the Heart of the City" - 6:12 
 "Fool for Your Loving" - 4:31 
 "Take Me with You" - 6:22 
 "We Wish You Well" - 1:37

References

External links
Official website

Whitesnake compilation albums
2004 compilation albums
EMI Records compilation albums